Abbottina obtusirostris is a species of ray-finned fish in the genus Abbottina who are found in the upper Yangtze River in Szechwan, China.

References

External links
 

Abbottina
Fish described in 1931
Fish of Asia
Freshwater fish of China